James or Jim Hubbard may refer to:

 Jim Hubbard (baseball) (1884–1932), American baseball player
 James Hubbard (rower) (1906–1960), American Olympic rower
 James Hubbard, 5th Baron Addington (1930–1982), British peer
 James Hubbard (murderer) (1930–2004), American murderer, sentenced to death by the state of Alabama in 1977, executed in 2004
 James W. Hubbard (born 1948), American politician in the Maryland House of Delegates
 Jim Hubbard (born 1949), New Zealand cartoonist
 James E. Hubbard, Jr. (born 1951), American mechanical engineer
 James Hubbard (darts player) (born 1992), English darts player